Madagascar: Operation Penguin is a platform video game for the Game Boy Advance, developed by Vicarious Visions and published by Activision. The game is based on DreamWorks' Madagascar animated film.

Overview 
The game loosely follows the penguin's side-plot from the film, as they attempt to escape from the Central Park Zoo. Players control Private throughout a variety of 2D platforming levels. Private obtains several gadgets and objects to assist him, including: a large frozen fish to attack, a fruit slingshot, a soda bottle jet pack, a straw blowpipe, and a hamburger wrapper parachute.

Reception
GameZone gave the game a 7.5/10, stating: "With more variety and some mini-games, this could have been a better game, but as it stands, it's still a good outing with those penguins from Madagascar". Console Gameworld said it offers "witty dialogue to keep the story moving along and has some replay value." Game Chronicles claimed that Operation Penguin is "technically a very solid game, and only falls apart once you realize that [...] it's all the same old same old."

References 

2005 video games
Activision games
Game Boy Advance games
Game Boy Advance-only games
Madagascar (franchise) video games
Platform games
Side-scrolling video games
Vicarious Visions games
Video games developed in the United States
Video games set in Antarctica
Video games set in Madagascar
Video games set in New York City